Worldwide Aeros Corp is an American manufacturer of airships based in Montebello, California. It was founded in 1993 by the current CEO and Chief Engineer, Igor Pasternak, who was born in Soviet Kazakhstan, raised in Soviet Ukraine, and moved to the U.S. after the Soviet collapse to build airships there. It currently employs more than 100 workers.

The company's current products are non-rigids aimed at both the military and commercial markets, including transport, surveillance, broadcasting and advertising. The company's best-selling ship is called the Sky Dragon.

The company is also developing an Aeroscraft, a rigid airship with a number of innovative features, the most important of which is a method of controlling the airship's static lift, which can be reduced by pumping helium from the internal gasbags and storing it under pressure: conversely lift can be increased by re-inflating the gasbags using the stored gas. The company has received $60 million from the U.S. Department of Defense to develop the concept, resulting in a prototype named Dragon Dream which underwent systems tests and some tethered flights in late 2013. This prototype was subsequently damaged when part of the roof of the hangar at the former Marine Corps Air Station in Tustin, in which it was constructed, collapsed on 7 October 2013.

History
In 1981, Igor Pasternak founded a design bureau at Lviv Polytechnic University. He started a private company in 1986 producing tethered balloons for advertising. It moved to the United States in 1994.

After 9/11, the company shifted its focus from advertising to surveillance, as its large ships can hold  of radar-surveillance equipment. The blimps have such varied uses as monitoring oil pipelines in Mexico to performing surveillance for the Ukrainian government along the Russian border.

In 2005, Aeros was granted the largest contract under DARPA's project Walrus HULA. Project Walrus was not renewed in 2010. However, the Pentagon continued to fund Aeros through the Rapid Reaction Technology Office, contracting with them in 2010 to build a prototype that could demonstrate key technologies.

The Pentagon has provided US$50 million in funding for the development of the "Pelican" prototype.

Aeroscraft

The Aeroscraft is a planned heavy-lift, variable-buoyancy cargo airship featuring an onboard buoyancy management system, rigid structure, vertical takeoff and landing performance, and operational abilities at low speed, in hover, and from unprepared surfaces. It has a number of innovative features, the most important of which is a method of controlling the airship's static lift, which can be reduced by pumping helium from the internal gasbags and storing it under pressure: conversely lift can be increased by reinflating the gasbags using the stored gas.

Project Pelican and Dragon Dream

Project Pelican was a US government-funded project to build and test a half-scale prototype of the proposed full-size Aeroscraft, using representative structure and avionics. The company received US$60 million from the U.S. Department of Defense to develop the concept, resulting in a prototype named Dragon Dream, which underwent systems tests and some tethered flights in late 2013. The Pentagon has declared that the tests of the Dragon Dream were a "success", with the craft meeting its demonstration objectives. The airship was rolled out of its hangar on July 4, 2013 and performed its first flight on September 11. It was subsequently damaged when part of the roof of the hangar collapsed on it on 7 October 2013. The company sued the Navy for $65 million in 2015 for the collapse.

Planned full-scale craft
The company is beginning production of two examples, an ML866 and an ML868 model. A model capable of lifting 500 tons, the ML86X, is also proposed.

The larger ML868 model will be  in length and carry 250 tons, with the same speed and altitude ceiling as the ML866.

Aeros is currently seeking US$3 billion to fund the construction of 24 Aeroscraft vehicles, including the 250-ton capacity ML868 model. The CEO has stated that he aims to have a global fleet operating by 2023.

Capabilities

Vertical takeoff and landing (VTOL) 
Because the Aeroscraft is equipped with VTOL capability, it can deliver cargo directly from point-of-origin to point-of-need. Furthermore, other hybrid airships are runway dependent at higher operating weights, but the Aeroscraft does not need a runway, even at full payload. Because of its COSH technology, its computer-controlled virtually-automated directional thrust and station-keeping technology facilitates off and on-loading stores while in hover.

Oversized cargo bay 
The cargo bay is located at the bottom of the aircraft cavity and is loaded by using a pulley system to load the cargo from the ground. At 1.8 million cubic feet, the cargo bay of the largest Aeroscraft design is much larger than that of any existing commercial freight aircraft (including the Boeing 747-8F and the Antonov 124 aircraft).

Design
The Aeroscraft is a rigid airship, having an internal structure to maintain its shape. As such it can reach otherwise difficult or inaccessible locations and can hover indefinitely at zero airspeed and with a full payload on board. The design incorporates cargo bays that are larger than any current air, truck or rail transport, while the payload capacity is significantly more than the current 16-ton maximum for helicopters.

Propulsion is provided by conventional propellers, and in addition the Aeroscraft design has six downward-pointing turbofan jet engines that assist in vertical take-off and landing. These turbofans, together with the Aeros "COSH" buoyancy control system, make the Aeroscraft capable of taking off and landing vertically without the need for a runway, a ground crew, or external ballast.

As with any airship, the Aeroscraft may be used to transport cargo to remote or difficult locations and to hover over uneven terrain, in both civil and military use.

The manufacturer also envisions the delivery of large amounts of commercial merchandise from a centralized location.

Technology

Control of static heaviness (COSH)
Aeros has developed a technology to avoid the need for ballast, which they call "control of static heaviness (COSH)". The main gas bag is inflated with helium to create lift for takeoff, then on landing some of the gas is re-compressed into a storage tank to partially deflate the gas bag and reduce lift.

Worldwide Aeros was awarded a patent for this system in May 2015. It internally ballasts the non-flammable helium into the aircraft’s helium pressure envelopes (HPEs), helping the vehicle manage buoyancy. The HPE units contain and control the compressed helium and allow the overall volume of helium to be reduced or increased, enabling the air vehicle to become heavy or buoyant in a controlled manner. The compression of helium into the HPE’s creates a negative pressure within the Aeroscraft Aeroshell, permitting air-expansion chambers to fill with air, which acts with reduced helium static lift to make the Aeroscraft heavier to compensate for adjustments in load.

Ceiling suspension cargo deployment system 
The Aeroscraft’s cargo system provides the aircraft with unmatched volume and flexibility when deploying cargo to virtually any point on the planet, empowering the aircraft to pick-up and off-load cargo in more efficient ways, even from hover. The internal cargo handling system has been designed to facilitate cargo loading, sorting, and unloading in a more innovative and efficient manner, overcoming pre-deployment requirements for ground handling cargo equipment in austere environments. The system affixes containers and cargo pallets to rails in the fuselage ceiling, rather than on the floor; adjusts cargo positioning to accommodate changes in center of gravity, such as when other cargo is loaded and unloaded; facilitates access to any piece of cargo at any time, eliminating unneeded cargo movements and reducing ground time; and eliminates labor costs with traditional cargo handling and weight-and-balance requirements.

Rigid structure 
This rigid structure has hard points for mounting engines, canards, cockpit, propulsion systems, and other auxiliary systems both inside and outside of the hull.

Landing system
The Aeroscraft is equipped with landing cushions which allow landing on rough terrain and water, and perform like a hovercraft during taxi by pushing air through them. In addition, the landing cushions have a suction capability which ensures the vehicle stays grounded and in place when not in flight. This allows it to operate in heavier wind conditions.

Vectored thrust engines
The Aeroscraft is equipped with vectored thrust engines that rotate and allow maneuverability. In addition to aiding helicopter-like vertical take-off and landing capability, the vectored thrust propels the vehicle in forward flight and aids the vehicle with ground-based taxiing.

Low speed control (LSC) 
When in forward flight, the Aeroscraft is controlled by the aerodynamic control surfaces ; however, the low speed control system aids the pilot in lower wind conditions such as during VTOL and hover. The LSC system acts as a rear thruster to propel the vehicle in forward flight, and permits the thrust to be redirected while in hover to help the vehicle maintain desired positioning and orientation.

Fleet

Airships 
Aeros 50: Aeros developed its first airships, the ‘Aeros 50'
40A Sky Dragon: Aeros launched airship model ’40A Sky Dragon,’ with increased payload and capabilities
40B Sky Dragon: Aeros developed the ’40B Sky Dragon’ equipped with a fly-by-wire system, and received FAA type certification
40D Sky Dragon: Aeros launched ’40D Sky Dragon,’ to global operations and receives type certification from the FAA
Dragon Dream: Aeros’ successful technology demonstration vehicle for the 66-ton capacity Aeroscraft, ‘Dragon Dream’ takes flight in 2013. Named RAVB as part of its development under Project Pelican for the Department of Defense

See also
 Cargolifter AG
 ESTOLAS
 P-791
 WALRUS HULA
 LEMV

References

External links

 
 Popular Science article
 "The Aeroscraft airship could change the very concept of flying", Wired

Companies based in Los Angeles County, California
Defense companies of the United States
Aircraft manufacturers of the United States
Montebello, California
Airships of the United States
Cargo aircraft
Emerging technologies